Phileurus didymus is a species of wood-feeding beetle of the family Scarabaeidae.

Description
Head, black, small, and triangular, having three tubercles issuing from it, of which the anterior is pointed, the others blunt. Thorax black, which is the general colour of the insect, rounded, smooth, and margined, having an impression in front, with a short tubercle situated on it near the edge; from whence runs a hollow groove or channel to the posterior margin. Scutellum small. Elytra shining, margined and furrowed. Abdomen smooth and shining, without hair. Tibiae furnished with spines, as are the first joints of the middle and posterior tarsi. Length 2 inches.

Distribution
P. didymus is native to Central America, and is also found in Peru and French Guiana.

References

External links
Biolib
Zipcodezoo Species Identifier
Catalogue of Life

Dynastinae
Beetles described in 1758
Descriptions from Illustrations of Exotic Entomology